FC St. Louis is an American women’s soccer team, founded in 2006. The team is a member of the Women's Premier Soccer League, the third tier of women’s soccer in the United States and Canada. The team plays in the Midwest Conference.

The team plays its home games in the stadium on the campus of Christian Brothers College in St. Louis, Missouri. The club's colors are white and red.

Players

Current roster

Notable former players

Year-by-year

Honors

Competition history

Coaches
  Mark Kiaser -present

Stadia
 Stadium at Christian Brothers College, St. Louis, Missouri -present

Average attendance

External links
 Official Site
 WPSL FC St. Louis page

Women's Premier Soccer League teams
Women's soccer clubs in the United States
Soccer clubs in Missouri
Soccer clubs in St. Louis
2006 establishments in Missouri
Association football clubs established in 2006
Women's sports in Missouri